Cheick Tidiane Seck (born December 11, 1953) is a Malian musician, arranger and composer. He has written for and played with African artists including Fela Kuti, Mory Kanté, Salif Keita, Youssou N'Dour and for jazz bands (Hank Jones, Dee Dee Bridgewater). He has also collaborated with musicians Damon Albarn (Blur, Gorillaz, Rocket Juice & the Moon) and Mamadou Diabate (Masaba Kan).

Discography        
 MandinGroove (2003)
 Sabaly (2008)
 Guerrier (2013)
 Timbuktu - The Music of Randy Weston (2018)

See also 
 Newen Afrobeat

References

External links 
 
  
  
 
 

1953 births
Music arrangers
20th-century Malian male singers
Living people
Malian guitarists
People from Ségou
Fela Kuti
Because Music artists
21st-century Malian male singers